Funes, a Great Love is a 1993 Argentine musical drama film directed by Raúl de la Torre and starring Graciela Borges, Gian Maria Volonté, Pepe Soriano, Moria Casán and Andrea Del Boca. It is based on a novel by Humberto Costantini.

The film consists of a series of flashbacks told by one of the characters, which date back to the 1930s and take place in a brothel in a small town in Argentina.

Cast 
 Graciela Borges as Azucena Funes
 Gian Maria Volonté as Bergama
 Pepe Soriano as Herminio
 Moria Casán as Felisa
 Andrea del Boca as Beatriz Núñez
 Rodolfo Ranni as Tito Izquierdo
 Nacha Guevara as Amanda
 Jairo as Julito Diaz
 Dora Baret as Sofía
 Beba Bidart as Doña Pancha
 Alfredo Zemma as Master Paladino
 Juan Cruz Bordeu as Mario
 Matías Gandolfo as Miguel
 Antonio Tarragó Ros as Musiquero
 Susana Rinaldias Tana
 Aníbal Vinelli
 Virgilio Expósito
 Daniel Binelli
 Roberto Amerise
 Carlos Buono
 Juan Carlos Copes
 María Nieves
 Teresa Brandon
 Carol Ilujas
 María José Gabín
 Argentinita Vélez
 José Andrada
 Carlos Broggi
 Constantino Cosma
 Raúl de la Torre

References

External links 
 

1990s musical drama films
1993 drama films
Argentine musical drama films
Films directed by Raúl de la Torre
Films with screenplays by Ugo Pirro
1990s Spanish-language films
1993 films